Borş can refer to:

 Borș (bran), an ingredient in Romanian cuisine used to make sour soup
 Borș, Bihor, a commune in Bihor County, Romania
 Valentin Borș (born 1983), Romanian football player